The  is a railway line of Kintetsu Railway in Nara Prefecture, Japan connecting Hirahata Station in Yamato-Kōriyama and Tenri Station in Tenri.
The line has four stations including the terminal Tenri and the transfer station Hirahata. It is mainly used by commuters in the morning and evening, as well as by followers of Tenrikyo, headquartered in Tenri, especially during festivals of the religion.

Route data
 Gauge: 
 Length: 
 Interlocking system: Electronic Interlocking

History
The Tenri Light Railway Co. opened a 762mm gauge line from its namesake town to Horyuji on the Kansai Main Line in 1915.

The Osaka Electric Railway Co. acquired the line in 1921, the year it opened the Kashihara Line, which connected at Hirahata. The following year the line was converted to 1435mm gauge and electrified at 600 VDC. That company merged with Kintetsu in 1944.

The Hirahata - Horyuji section closed in 1952, and in 1969 the voltage was raised to 1500 VDC. The line was duplicated in 1988.

Stations
Express trains and local trains stop at every station on the Tenri Line.

References
This article incorporates material from the corresponding article in the Japanese Wikipedia

Tenri Line
Rail transport in Nara Prefecture
Standard gauge railways in Japan